Ayatollah Sayyid Mohammad Bahr al-Uloom (‎; 17 December 1927 – 7 April 2015) was a Twelver Shi'a Islamic leader and politician in Iraq, who served as the President of the Governing Council of Iraq (43rd Prime Minister of Iraq).

Biography 
Bahraluloom was born in Najaf in 1927 to Ali Bahraluloom, the son of Hadi Bahraluloom (d. 1904). He grew up and studied in Najaf, under his father, as well as other notable scholars of the religious seminary of Najaf.

He was a long time opponent of the rule of Saddam Hussein. By 1992 he had moved to London where he opposed Saddam's rule for many years. He was an active member of London's Shi'a community and was the head of AhlulBayt Centre in South London. In November 1992, at the Salahuddin gathering, within the safety of the southern air exclusion zone, along with Masoud Barzani and Colonel Hassan al-Naqib, he was one of the three men to be appointed to the presidential council by the Iraqi National Congress. Mohammad Bahraluloom continued to live in London prior to the 2003 Iraq invasion.

After the United States deposed Saddam Hussein in 2003, as part of Operation Iraqi Freedom, Bahraluloom was appointed to the Iraq interim governing council. He agreed to participate in the interim government and was appointed to the nine-member rotating presidency. He was the first president of the council, in an interim capacity, serving in that position from 13 July 2003 until 1 August 2003.

In August 2003, Mohammed Baqir al-Hakim, a friend of Bahraluloom, was killed in a car bombing. Shortly after, Bahraluloom announced his voluntary suspension from the council, citing the failure of the council's ability to maintain law and order in post-war Iraq. He later returned to the council, and became president again on 1 March 2004, serving until 1 April 2004.

Personal life 
Bahraluloom was married to the daughter of Muhammad-Husayn al-Shirazi (d. 1955), the grandson of Mirza Shirazi. He had four daughters and three sons. 

His son, Ibrahim, was the Oil Minister of Iraq from September 2003 to June 2004, and again during 2005. His son, Muhammad-Husayn is the Ambassador of Iraq to the United Nations.

Death 
Bahraluloom died due to complications with his kidneys in 2015.

References

External links 

 Bahraluloom Charitable Foundation

|-

1927 births
2015 deaths
British people of Iraqi descent
Iraqi ayatollahs
Iraqi politicians
Iraqi Shia Muslims
Islamic Dawa Party politicians